The Battery Court Historic District is a national historic district located at Richmond, Virginia. The district encompasses 549 contributing buildings and 1 contributing site (Battery Park) located north of downtown Richmond and west of Barton Heights and Brookland Park.  The primarily residential area developed starting in the early-20th century as one of the city's early “streetcar suburbs.” The buildings are in a variety of popular late-19th and early-20th century architectural styles including frame bungalows, American Foursquare, Colonial Revival, Tudor Revival, and Mission Revival.  Notable non-residential buildings include the Overbrook Presbyterian Church (now All Souls Presbyterian) and Battery Park Christian Church (now Mount Hermon Baptist).

It was added to the National Register of Historic Places in 2003.

References

Streetcar suburbs
Historic districts on the National Register of Historic Places in Virginia
Colonial Revival architecture in Virginia
Tudor Revival architecture in Virginia
Mission Revival architecture in Virginia
Buildings and structures in Richmond, Virginia
National Register of Historic Places in Richmond, Virginia